Knox Cameron (born September 17, 1983 in Kingston) is a Jamaican-born American soccer player who most recently played for AFC Ann Arbor in the National Premier Soccer League.

Career

College and Amateur
Cameron grew up in New York City, attended Cardinal Spellman High School in The Bronx, and played college soccer at the University of Michigan, where he is second in the school's all-time record for goals (28) and points (72), and was named Big Ten Player of the Year his junior year.

Playing in the indoor and rec league's while in Michigan, Cameron excelled in the bare-foot method of playing soccer, and once scored 14 goals in an indoor soccer game while playing with no shoes on.

During his college years Cameron also played in the USL Premier Development League for the Brooklyn Knights and the Michigan Bucks.

Knox also played for Pasco Soccer Club from Wayne, NJ during his high school years. He helped the team win countless tournaments and was one of a handful of players from the club to move on to play professional soccer.

Professional
Cameron suffered a serious knee injury while playing for the Michigan Bucks, and subsequently missed much of his senior year at Michigan. As a result of this, and doubts over his signability, Cameron slipped to the fourth round of the 2005 MLS SuperDraft, where he was drafted by Columbus Crew. He went on to play 30 games and score 4 goals for the team over the next two years, but following the 2006 season, he was waived by the team.  During his time with the Crew he played a friendly against English side Everton and thanked them on the scoreboard for coming to Columbus so he could beat them.

Following his release by Crew, Cameron played for amateur team Canton Celtic, which plays in Michigan's MUSL Men's Open 1st Division. Celtic won the Michigan section of the USASA National Amateur Cup Championship, and represented the state at the 2008 USASA Regional tournament in Bowling Green, Kentucky.

Cameron returned to play for the Michigan Bucks in the USL Premier Development League in 2009, and then signed with Detroit City FC in 2012. He made his DCFC debut against the Erie Admirals on May 26, 2012, scoring the first goal in a 3-0 victory.  He continued to play for DCFC in 2013, and scored two goals in their opener and another in the home opener. Cameron scored again in DCFC's 2-0 over Zanseville AFC, giving him 4 goals on the season.

Post-Professional
Cameron now is a co-owner and player for AFC Ann Arbor in Ann Arbor, Michigan. Cameron also helps with a youth soccer club called Saline FC.

International
Cameron elected to represent the United States internationally, and played for various youth national teams, being brought to UAE in 2003 for FIFA World Youth Championship.

References

External links
 Columbus Crew player profile
 Michigan bio

1983 births
Living people
AFC Ann Arbor players
African-American soccer players
American soccer players
Association football forwards
Brooklyn Knights players
Columbus Crew draft picks
Columbus Crew players
Jamaican emigrants to the United States
Major League Soccer players
Flint City Bucks players
Michigan Wolverines men's soccer players
National Premier Soccer League players
Sportspeople from the Bronx
Soccer players from New York City
Sportspeople from Kingston, Jamaica
United States men's under-20 international soccer players
USL League Two players
Cardinal Spellman High School (New York City) alumni
Detroit City FC players
21st-century African-American sportspeople
20th-century African-American people